"Always" is a song by American recording artist Trina. It features guest vocals by singer Monica and was written by Derrick Baker, Josh Augustus Burke, Cainon Lamb, and Michael Sterling and co-produced by Bigg D and Lamb for her fifth studio album, Amazin' (2010).

Formats and track listings
These are the formats and track listings of major single-releases of "Always."

Digital single
"Always" (featuring Monica)  — 4:01
"Always" (featuring Monica)  — 4:01
"Always"  — 4:01

Charts

Release history

References

2010 singles
Trina songs
Monica (singer) songs
2010 songs
EMI Records singles
Songs written by Trina
Songs written by Cainon Lamb
Songs written by Bigg D